"For You I Will" is a song by American recording artist Monica. It was written by Diane Warren and produced by David Foster, and recorded for the soundtrack of the live-action/animated sports comedy film Space Jam (1996), directed by Joe Pytka and starring basketball player Michael Jordan. One out of several songs from the album to be released as a single, it was issued in February 25, 1997 by Atlantic Records and Rowdy Records. A downtempo pop and R&B ballad, the song's lyrics involve the singer pledging love and devotion and promising to help an unnamed "you" overcome any difficulty, regardless of the magnitude.

The song debuted at an impressive number on the Billboard Hot 100, peaking at number four, becoming Monica's second top five single and one of her highest-charting songs of the 1990s. It was eventually certified platinum by the Recording Industry Association of America (RIAA) on July 2, 1997, and ranked 13th on Billboards Top Hot 100 Hits of 1997. Elsewhere, "For You I Will" reached the top five in the Netherlands, New Zealand, and on the Canadian Adult Contemporary chart. It was later included on her second album, The Boy Is Mine (1998).

Critical reception
Alan Jones from Music Week wrote, "It's one of those anthemic ballads that Warren has a knack for writing, building to a swayalong finale with Monica's inch-perfect R&B-inflected vocals proving a perfect foil."

Music video
The music video of "For You I Will" was directed by Francis Lawrence in a movie studio, in New York City. It inter-cuts scenes from Space Jam with scenes featuring Monica.

Track listings

Credits and personnel
Credits are adapted from the liner notes of The Boy Is Mine.

 Monica Arnold – lead vocals
 Sue Ann Carwell – backing vocals
 Felipe Elgueta – engineering
 David Foster – arrangement, keyboards, production
 Simon Franglen – Synclavier programming
 Mick Guzauski – mixing
 Tim Lauber – recording assistance
 Jeff Pescetto – backing vocals
 Marnie Riley – mixing assistance
 Michael Thompson – guitar

Charts

Weekly charts

Year-end charts

Certifications

Release history

References

1990s ballads
1996 songs
1996 singles
1997 singles
Monica (singer) songs
Songs written by Diane Warren
Music videos directed by Francis Lawrence
Songs written for films
Song recordings produced by David Foster
Pop ballads
Contemporary R&B ballads
Atlantic Records singles
Rowdy Records singles
Looney Tunes songs
Songs written for animated films
Space Jam